Merel is a Dutch feminine given name, probably after the identical Dutch name for the blackbird (Turdus merula). It has also been used as a surname. Notable people with the name include:

Given name
 Merel de Blaeij (born 1986), Dutch field hockey player
 Merel Blom (born 1986), Dutch Olympic eventing rider
 Merel van Dongen (born 1993), Dutch football midfielder 
 Merel de Knegt (born 1979), Dutch runner
 Merel Mooren (born 1982), Dutch volleyball player
 Merel Poloway (born 1946), American actress, wife of Raúl Juliá
 Merel S. Sager (1899–1982), American architect and landscape architect
 Merel Witteveen (born 1985), Dutch sailor
Surname
 Loïc Merel (born 1965), French mathematician

See also
 Merrell (disambiguation)

Dutch feminine given names